What You're Getting Into is Shannon Curfman's third full-length album.

Track listing 
 "What You’re Getting Into" – 3:25
 "Free Your Mind" – 3:04
 "The Core" (Duet with Joe Bonamassa) (Eric Clapton/Marcy Levy) – 6:21
 "Heaven Is In Your Mind" – 3:28
 "All I Have" – 3:54
 "Curious" – 3:36
 "Oh Well" (Peter Green) – 5:10
 "What Would Mama Say" – 3:26
 "Dragon Attack" (Brian May) – 3:37
 "Strange" – 4:53

Charts
Album – Billboard (North America)

Personnel 
Shannon Curfman – vocals, guitar, producer
Wade Thompson – bass
Justin Kesterson – guitar
Paul Robert Thompson – drums, percussion
Anthony Krizan – guitar
Paul Mayasich – guitar
Joe Bonamassa – guitar and vocals on track 3
Stevie D. – guitar
Lucy Curfman – background vocals
Jason Miller – guitar, percussion, programming, producer, engineer, mixing
Nels Urtel – background vocals
Greg Reierson – mastering
Dave Niemela – album design
Erin Zemanovic – photography
Ross Harvey – assistant engineer
Jay Sandstorm – assistant engineer
Steve Severson – assistant engineer
James Davis – assistant engineer
Alex DeYoung – assistant engineer
Stuart Brantley – audio engineering

References 

2010 albums
Shannon Curfman albums